Addison Adrianne Forbes Montgomery, M.D., F.A.C.S., F.A.C.O.G  is a fictional character who appears as a supporting main character on the ABC television series Grey's Anatomy, and as the protagonist of its spin-off  Private Practice played by Kate Walsh. Addison is a world-class neonatal surgeon with board certifications in both Obstetrics and Gynaecology and Maternal and Fetal Medicine. Additionally, she has completed a medical genetics fellowship. She works at the Oceanside Wellness Group, a fictional practice located in Santa Monica, California.

Addison joined the series in the first-season finale as Derek Shepherd (Patrick Dempsey)'s estranged wife. Initially set for a recurring guest stint on Grey's, Walsh's character expanded into a series regular position as Rhimes grew fond of Walsh's portrayal of the character. She is promoted to series regular in season two episode seven, "Something To Talk About". She makes her final appearance as a series regular in the season three finale, "Didn't We Almost Have It All?", but returns as a guest star for the following five seasons, including a two-part guest stint in the fifth season. 

Once the love-triangle storyline had been resolved, Rhimes created the first spin-off of Grey's Anatomy based on the character named Private Practice which saw Addison move to Los Angeles to start anew, after two seasons as a series regular. The spin-off lasted six seasons, running concurrently with the fourth to ninth seasons of Grey's Anatomy. Walsh deciding to retire the character after eight years of portraying her, making her final series regular appearance in the Grey's Anatomy universe in the Private Practice series finale, "In Which We Say Goodbye" on January 22, 2013. Walsh returned to the role almost nine years later in recurring capacity, for the eighteenth and nineteenth seasons of the original series.

Storylines

Backstory 
Most of Addison's past is presented in a non-linear fashion, primarily revealed in the second season of Grey's Anatomy and the second and third season of Private Practice. Addison is the daughter of wealthy parents and has a $25 million trust fund. Addison's father is nicknamed "The Captain" and is a doctor who teaches medicine at a university where Addison would sit and watch as a child. Her father used spending time with his daughter as a pretense for his many affairs. Addison's mother is Beatrice "Bizzy" Forbes Montgomery and her brother, Archer, is a world-class neurologist and successful author. Addison met her future husband, Derek Shepherd, in medical school. Addison is a Yale University graduate and attended Columbia University College of Physicians and Surgeons in New York City for medical school. She met future colleagues Sam and Naomi Bennett there as well. Addison and Derek each began their practice in New York City, which placed a strain on their marriage. Their marriage was troubled in the years leading to Derek's decision to leave New York as it is eventually revealed in both Grey's Anatomy and Private Practice that Derek's mother did not approve of her (choosing to give her dead husband's ring to Derek's second wife,  Meredith Grey) and Addison's brother Archer disliked Derek. Addison's affair with Derek's best friend Mark Sloan drove the wedge even further and Derek's departure to Seattle. Addison briefly attempted to have a relationship with Mark, which resulted in her becoming pregnant. She then had an abortion soon after she discovered that Mark cheated on her, and as she was still in love with Derek. She then moved to Seattle.

Grey's Anatomy 
The character Addison first appears in the season one finale of Grey's Anatomy, arriving at Richard's behest. She tries to reconcile with Derek, despite his relationship with Meredith Grey, but he is still angry with her, and there is a period of antagonism between them. Addison's presence, however, does reinvigorate their relationship, and ultimately leads to Derek choosing Addison over Meredith, despite Derek eventually admitting that he fell in love with Meredith. They attempt to return to their former life, taking residence in his trailer, and Addison becomes the head of a unique surgical service integrating neonatal surgery and obstetrics and gynecology. She realizes that Derek still has feelings for Meredith, and their marriage is tested further when Mark arrives in Seattle looking for Addison. Mark makes Addison realize that Derek is in love with Meredith and that he (Mark) does love her. Derek sleeps with Addison after he sees that Meredith has moved on. When Addison finds out that Derek had sex with Meredith, she gets drunk and sleeps with Mark. He asks for a relationship, but she rejects him.

During season two, Addison punishes Alex Karev, by putting him on her service, because he almost got her arrested. However, by season three, she begins to feel an attraction towards Alex and eventually sleeps with him, only to discover that he is not interested in a relationship with her. Feeling alone, Addison decides to have a baby and visits Naomi, who is a fertility specialist. This storyline introduces Addison's transition from Grey's Anatomy to its spin-off, as it serves as the backdoor pilot for Private Practice. Soon after, Addison decides to leave Seattle and move to Los Angeles, joining Oceanside Wellness, led by Sam and Naomi. This marks Addison's departure from Grey's Anatomy as a regular, although she makes at least one guest appearance per season until the eighth season.  

On September 2, 2021, it was announced on social media that Kate Walsh would return to play Dr. Montgomery for the show's eighteenth season. She reprised her role for three episodes: "Hotter than Hell", "With a Little Help From My Friends" and "Should I Stay or Should I Go?".

Private Practice 
In the series' first episode, Addison is made to feel unwelcome by the other doctors but chooses to stay. Addison is attracted to Pete Wilder, the practice's alternative medicine specialist. When Pete stands her up on a date, Addison decides they should be friends and nothing more and instead accepts a date with Kevin, a police officer she met through work. In a crossover episode, Addison briefly returns to Seattle Grace to help with a patient. Before she leaves, Addison advises Meredith not to let Derek get away.

In season two, Addison learns from Naomi that the practice is failing financially. She tells Sam against Naomi's wishes, and, feeling betrayed, Naomi breaks off her friendship with Addison. Addison inadvertently prompts the staff to vote between Sam and Naomi and is surprised when instead, she is elected to lead the practice as its director.

Addison's relationship with Kevin is tested when her brother Archer tells Kevin he is not good enough for her. Addison reassures him, but it causes them to break up later. Addison is surprised when Archer begins working for Pacific Wellcare Center, a rival practice. When he experiences multiple seizures and believes he has a brain tumor, Addison asks Derek to treat Archer in another crossover episode with Grey's Anatomy. Derek discovers he has parasites in his brain, and successfully removes them. Naomi and Archer begin dating, which puts some strain on the friendship between Addison and Naomi. Addison also dates a man who is later revealed to be married. Also during this time, it is shown that Addison's mother Bizzy is a lesbian who has been in a long-term affair with her best friend. Addison is angry because she always blamed her father for his numerous extra-marital affairs and was angry at how he treated Bizzy, not realizing that her mother was the one in a serious extramarital relationship. Addison's father is aware of her mother's affair, but they decided a long time ago that they would stay married to one another because Bizzy is not comfortable with others knowing about her sexuality. Although the relationship with her parents is strained from this, in the end, they make peace.

Addison and Sam start developing feelings for each other. It is revealed that, back in college, Sam wanted to ask Addison out but was too nervous, and he ended up with Naomi. They shared a kiss after a terrifying ordeal when they tried to save a married couple who got into a devastating car accident. They kiss again when Addison decides to sleep over at Sam's. Addison and Sam grow close, but she chooses to put a halt on their developing relationship, worried about the consequences in her friendship with Naomi. Addison revealed that she was in love with Sam and Pete, but she decided to begin a relationship with Pete instead, while Sam was with another doctor. Despite them being with other people, they still show they harbor feelings for each other, including jealousy when they see the other with their current significant others. After Sam becomes single again, he kisses Addison again. Although she was with Pete, she kisses Sam back and Pete catches them. Despite this, they stay together. Naomi ends her friendship with Addison after she finds about Sam and Addison. In the season finale, Addison has to operate on Maya Bennett, her godchild, who got in a car accident on her way to the hospital to give birth. She and Naomi then make up. Addison breaks up with Pete, and she and Sam finally become a couple. Although Addison wants to have children, Sam tells her he's not ready to have more children, as he wants to take time in their romance. Sam and Addison end their relationship and Addison goes on a date with a man named Jake (played by Benjamin Bratt). He invites her to Fiji, and although she initially agrees, in the end she chooses to get back together with Sam.

At the beginning of season 5, Sam and Addison are back together, although they break up again as he is still not ready to commit to marriage and a family with her. Jake is hired at the practice, which at first makes Addison uncomfortable. Jake is a very gifted doctor whose speciality is helping women with fertility issues become pregnant. He becomes Addison's doctor and helps her attempt to conceive using IVF. Throughout the season, Addison and Jake grow closer. It is revealed that Jake had a wife, Lily, who was a drug addict and died from an overdose. He adopted her daughter Angela, who is featured in the final two seasons of the show. She is often shown advising her father and encourages him to pursue a relationship with Addison, whom he clearly has feelings for. Although Addison still has feelings for Sam, she also has feelings for Jake, the latter of whom wants to get married and have kids. On more than one occasion, Addison and Jake kiss, and both admit to having feelings for the other. However, Jake realizes that Addison is not over Sam and does not want to be a rebound, but tells her he will wait for her. Although Addison decides to stop fertility treatments, her dream of having a child finally comes true, and she adopts a baby boy named Henry. Sam begins to regret his decision to leave Addison and makes excuses to spend time with Henry, but Addison decides to focus on her baby instead of pursuing a relationship with either Sam or Jake. In the season finale, Addison and Jake have sex after Amelia delivers a brainless baby whose organs she donates so that her pregnancy will still be meaningful. When Addison arrives home, Sam is there with Henry and he proposes to Addison. It is not revealed what she says, but we also see that Jake is on his way to her house with flowers and Chinese food.

In the beginning of season 6, we find that Addison rejected Sam and is now pursuing a relationship with Jake. Jake and Addison move in together later in the season after she admits to being in love with him. She then proposes marriage. Although initially, he does not give her an answer, over the course of the episode he gains closure with his wife and realizes that Addison is who he wants to spend his life with. When Addison gets home, Jake has lit candles and lined the living room with rose petals, leading to the deck where he is waiting for her in a suit and tie. He tells her to ask him again, and gives her a ring, after which point the two are engaged. In the final episode of Private Practice, Jake and Addison get married and are beginning the rest of their lives with Henry.

Development

Casting and creation 

Kate Walsh first appeared as Addison on Grey's Anatomy. The character was initially planned to appear in several episodes but quickly became a regular on the show before leaving for Private Practice. In June 2012, Kate Walsh announced on Bethenny that the upcoming sixth season of Private Practice would be her last one. "It's been an incredible journey and an amazing ride and I'm hugely, hugely grateful. It's bittersweet. It's a huge chapter of my life. It's been eight years," she said.

Characterization 
Montgomery was initially described as "cold and unforgiving". As episodes passed, it was noted that the writers had "softened" the character.  Walsh summarized her as "a girl you love to hate". She said of Montgomery's transition from the end of Grey's Anatomy first season to the second: "She started out so together. Now she's a cat without a whisker — a little off balance and leaving a mess all over the hospital. She's a little untethered now, she's coming unraveled."

Walsh felt that Montgomery had become "stronger" and "more centered" between the first and the second season of Private Practice, "Initially she's still getting her footing, still isn't quite sure and a little wobbly, and then you see that she's got her groove back." Additionally, Walsh said of the character that "she's flawed and arrogant and really good at what she does. And no matter what happens, she picks herself up and moves on. She keeps trying." Walsh expressed satisfaction with the evolution of Montgomery's love life because "the only thing we saw of her in Grey's Anatomy was the ugly side of the Derek/Meredith triangle. And then, of course, Mark Sloan, but there was no real love there." She said the pairing of her character with Kevin Nelson (David Sutcliffe) is different from what transpires with Pete Wilder (Tim Daly) or Derek Shepherd (Patrick Dempsey); "It's really fun to see this total other side of her come out that we never saw. It hit me, this little epiphany of like, 'Oh, we've never seen Addison into someone or someone that likes her back.'"

Reception 

TV Guide said of Walsh's stint on Grey's Anatomy: "Kate Walsh kicks butt as Addison, and I hope she sticks around. She adds spice to an already hot show." Joel Keller of AOL TV was disappointed with the character's evolution from Grey's Anatomy to Private Practice during its first season, saying she "went from strong and funny to whimpering and lovelorn." Keller was, however, happy to observe some maturity in the second season's storylines and that what he liked about her, "the ability to perform complicated surgical procedures even while everything in her personal life is in chaos", was reintroduced. By the time Private Practice ended, Margaret Lyons of New York Magazine deemed the character "fun" and added: "Even when tragedy befell her at every turn on PP, she was still sort of sassy and bright and interesting." Montgomery appeared in Comcast's list of TV's Most Intriguing Characters. Glamour named her one of the 12 Most Stylish TV Characters.  She was listed in Wetpaint's "10 Hottest Female Doctors on TV" and in BuzzFeed's "16 Hottest Doctors On Television".

In 2006, Walsh was among the cast of Grey's Anatomy to win the Satellite Award for Best Ensemble in a Television Series. The cast, including her, was nominated for the Screen Actors Guild Award for Outstanding Performance by an Ensemble in a Drama Series, which they won in 2007, and were nominated for again the following year. For her work on Private Practice, Walsh earned a nomination for Favorite TV Drama Actress at the 37th People's Choice Awards.

Notes

References

External links 
 Grey's Anatomy at ABC.com
 Private Practice at ABC.com

Grey's Anatomy characters
Fictional surgeons
Fictional characters from Connecticut
Fictional characters from New York City
Private Practice (TV series) characters
Television characters introduced in 2005
Fictional obstetricians and gynaecologists
Fictional female doctors
Fictional Columbia University people
American female characters in television